The Krishnaswami Temple is a Hindu temple located in the neighbourhood of Muthialpet in Parry's corner (Old: George Town), Chennai, India. It was constructed in the 18th century and was the site of a major dispute between Left hand and Right hand castes in 1787 resulting in a major riot. The conflict eventually came to an end with the mediation of the authorities of the Madras government.

See also
 Religion in Chennai

References 

 

Hindu temples in Chennai